Supa Dupa Diva is the first extended play and debut major release by South Korean girl group Dal Shabet, released January 4, 2011. "Supa Dupa Diva" was used as the lead single. Promotions began on January 6. on M! Countdown.

Track listing

Chart performance

Sales and certifications

References
   
  

2011 debut EPs
Dance-pop EPs
Korean-language EPs
K-pop EPs
Dal Shabet albums